Planotortrix octo is a moth of the family Tortricidae. It is endemic to New Zealand, where it is found in both the North and South islands.

The larvae feed on Ribes, Chaenomeles, Cotoneaster, Crataegus, Cydonia, Eriobotrya, Fragaria, Kerria, Malus, Photinia, Prunus, Pyracantha, Rosa, Rhaphiolepis, Rubus, Boronia, Choysia, Citrus and Phebalium species. It is considered to be a pest species.

References

Archipini
Moths of New Zealand
Moths described in 1990
Endemic fauna of New Zealand
Endemic moths of New Zealand